The name "yellow bunting" can also refer to the yellowhammer (Emberiza citrinella).
The yellow bunting or Japanese yellow bunting (Emberiza sulphurata) is a passerine bird of eastern Asia in the bunting family Emberizidae. It is threatened by habitat loss, the use of pesticides and trapping for the cagebird industry.

Description 
It is 14 cm long and has a conical, grey bill, pinkish-brown feet and brown eyes. The male is grey-green above with black streaks on the back. The underparts are yellow-green (brightest on the throat and belly) with streaks on the flanks. It has black lores, a narrow black chin, a pale eye ring and white outer tail feathers. There are two bars on the wing, formed by pale tips to the median and greater wing coverts. The female is similar to the male but paler without the black on the lores and chin. The species has a twittering song and a soft  call.

The breeding season lasts from mid-May to early July. The nest is built low in a bush and three to five eggs are laid.

Habitat and Conservation Status 
The yellow bunting breeds only in Japan where it is uncommon. It is found mainly on the largest island Honshu but may also breed on Kyushu and possibly bred on Hokkaido in the past. It occurs in forest and woodland between 600 and 1500 metres above sea level, mainly in the central and northern parts of Honshū. A few birds winter in the warmer regions of Japan but most migrate further south. It has been recorded from the Philippines, Taiwan, Hong Kong and south-east China at this season but is scarce everywhere. It occurs in woodland, scrub, grassland and farmland during winter. Small numbers pass through Korea on spring and autumn migration.

The total population of the yellow bunting is small and decreasing and the species is classified as least concern by the IUCN with the population estimated to be 2,500 to 9,999 mature individuals and continuing to decrease. It is threatened by habitat loss, the use of pesticides and trapping for the cagebird industry.

References

BirdLife International (2007) Species factsheet: Emberiza sulphurata. Downloaded from http://www.birdlife.org on 20/6/2007
Brazil, Mark A. (1991) The Birds of Japan, Christopher Helm, London
Kennedey, Robert S.; Gonzales, Pedro C,; Dickinson, Edward C.; Miranda, Hector C. & Fisher, Timothy H. (2000) A Guide to the Birds of the Philippines, Oxford University Press, Oxford
Lee, Woo-Shin, Koo, Tae-Hoe & Park, Jin-Young (2000) A Field Guide to the Birds of Korea, LG Evergreen Foundation, Seoul
MacKinnon, John & Phillipps, Karen (2000) A Field Guide to the Birds of China, Oxford University Press, Oxford

External links

yellow bunting
Birds of Japan
yellow bunting